The Edison Career and Technology High School (also known as the Rochester Factory School, the Rochester Shop School and the Thomas Alva Edison Technical and Industrial High School) was a public high school in Rochester, New York, part of the Rochester City School District. It was founded in 1908, and in the 1990s was converted to the Edison Technical Education Center, housing a group of Career and Technical Education programs which have been established, abolished and combined in various ways.

The school teams are known as the Edison Inventors.

History 
The Rochester Factory School was established in 1908. In 1911 it was moved to a building in Exposition Park (which had formerly housed the Western House of Refuge, a reform school) owned by the district, and around 1913 the name was changed to the Rochester Shop School. It was moved to a different building in the park in 1917, and in 1918 to another building at Joseph Avenue and Avenue D. In 1926 it was moved again, to several floors of a building on the grounds of the Bausch & Lomb Optical Company plant. In 1931, the name was changed to the Thomas Alva Edison Technical and Industrial High School, and soon shortened to Edison Technical School.

In the fall of 1940, Edison Tech moved yet again into the former Washington High School on Clifford Avenue, now with 1400 students. The former students and staff of Washington High were relocated to Benjamin Franklin High School. This included 1300 pupils and 47 teachers. Finally, Edison Tech moved into is current location at 655 Colfax St. in the fall of 1979. 

In the 1990s Edison Tech was converted to the Edison Technical Education Center, housing a group of CTE programs which would subsequently be established, abolished and combined in various ways. Students share the same site and operate a single combined sports program, which still uses the Edison Tech name; the community perceives that the students go to "Edison Tech".  As of 2013, reports from a state agency concluded that the new schools were failing to meet the needs of 21st-century employers, and offered a number of possible solutions, none of which involved re-establishing the traditional Edison Tech.

References 

Public high schools in New York (state)
High schools in Monroe County, New York